Augustus Alfred de Bourbel (1835 – 15 May 1917) was an English cricketer.  de Bourbel's batting style is unknown.  He was educated at Harrow School.

de Bourbel made a single first-class appearance for the Marylebone Cricket Club against Cambridge University at Fenner's in 1854.  Batting first, Cambridge University were dismissed for just 66, while in their first-innings, the Marylebone Cricket Club made 166, with de Bourbel, who batted at number ten, ending unbeaten on 12.  Cambridge University made 104 in their second-innings, leaving the Marylebone Cricket Club just one run to win.

He died at St Mary Bourne, Hampshire on 15 May 1917.

References

External links
Augustus de Bourbel at ESPNcricinfo
Augustus de Bourbel at CricketArchive

1835 births
1917 deaths
People educated at Harrow School
English cricketers
Marylebone Cricket Club cricketers
People from St Mary Bourne